Lieutenant-General Kanwar Bahadur Singh, MBE, (5 August 1910 – 8 May 2007) was a senior officer in the Indian Army.

Early life and education

Bahadur Singh was born in the Thikana of Palaitha in the princely state of Kotah on 5 August 1910, the son of Major-General Sir Onkar Singh, KCIE, a minister for the state of Kotah.  He attended the Prince of Wales Royal Indian Military College (RIMC) from August 1923 to 26 August 1929. During his time at the college, he became Section Commander for Kitchener Section and Cadet Captain. Following his education at RIMC, he gained entrance to the Royal Military College, Sandhurst. He would join Sandhurst as the top student from India.

Military career
Upon graduation from Sandhurst, he was commissioned as a Second Lieutenant on the Unattached List for appointment to the Indian Army on 27 August 1931. He was attached to the 2nd battalion, Highland Light Infantry which was stationed in India for a year before being appointed to the Indian Army and posted to the 4th battalion, 19th Hyderabad Regiment.
 
He was promoted to Captain on 1 January 1939.  His battalion participated in the ill-fated Malayan Campaign.  Following their defeat in the Battle of Singapore, he was taken prisoner and spent the remainder of the war in a Japanese internment camp.  On 9 May 1946, in recognition of gallant and distinguished services as a prisoner of war, he was appointed a Member of the Order of the British Empire.  

He opted for the Indian Army on partition in 1947 and rose up the ranks to serve as GOC-in-C for Central Command from 1962 to 1966 before retiring as a Lieutenant-General.

He was Colonel of the Kumaon Regiment from 16 May 1961 to 15 May 1971.

Later life
After retiring from the army, Lt. Gen. K. Bahadur Singh was appointed Lieutenant Governor of the Union Territory of Himachal Pradesh from 16 May 1967 to 24 January 1971.

He was married to Rajendra Kumari of Barwani and had five children, a son (Kr Jaivir Singh Palaitha) and 4 daughters (Jyostna, Jaya, Padmini & Durga). He died in May 2007 at the age of 97.

Dates of rank

Campaign medals
 War Medal 1939-1945
 Pacific Star
 Order of the British Empire

Notes

References
Mishra, S., & Singh, B. (1997). Where Gallantry is Tradition: Saga of Rastriya Indian Military College. Allied Publishers. 
State of Himachal Pradesh Web Site

Notes

External links
Archiver.rootsweb.com
Hpvidhansabha.nic.in
 Indian Army
 Bharat Rakshak: The Consortium of Indian Military Websites

British Indian Army officers
Indian Army personnel of World War II
Indian prisoners of war
World War II prisoners of war held by Japan
Indian generals
Graduates of the Royal Military College, Sandhurst
Commandants of National Defence College, India
People from Rajasthan
Rajasthani people
Members of the Order of the British Empire
Rashtriya Indian Military College alumni
Governors of Himachal Pradesh
Military personnel from Rajasthan
2007 deaths
1910 births
Indian Members of the Order of the British Empire